Khandowa is a town in a Kallar Kahar Tehsil of Chakwal District. The town's natural environment includes a number of historical lakes and resorts. Khandowa is 8 km distant from Kallar Kahar, 36 km from Chakwal, 114 km from Islamabad and 101 km from Rawalpindi in a northerly direction.

Name and history 
Khandowa word is derived from Punjabi word khand, meaning sweet.

Landmarks 
Khandowa lake

Khandowa ground(Khandowa Valley)

People and tribes Khandowa
People belonging to this village are mostly employees in Pakistan Army in various ranks, while the rest of the population are involved in livestock farming. General Musarrat Nawaz Malik s/o Col Muhammad Nawaz Malik, (Tamgha e Basalat) also hails from same village.

Tourism 
The area's tourist attractions include its valleys, and the lake of Swaik.

Gallery 
Lake Khandowa Gallery Good Images by Muhammad Ehsan Khandowa

References

Villages in Kallar Kahar Tehsil
Populated places in Chakwal District